Aeschremon similis is a moth in the family Crambidae. It was described by Jan Asselbergs in 2008 and is found in the United Arab Emirates.

References

Moths described in 2008
Odontiini
Moths of Asia